UFO Files is an American television series that was produced from 2004 to 2007 for The History Channel. The program covers the phenomena of unidentified flying and submerged objects, close encounters with alleged extraterrestrial life, and alleged military and government cover-up conspiracies.

In 2008, a following series called UFO Hunters premiered on the same channel.

Interviews
Some of the scientists and experts that have been interviewed in the series are:
 Dennis Balthaser – ufologist
 William J. Birnes – author, publisher, and ufologist
 Phyllis Budinger – research scientist
 James Clarkson – former police detective, ufologist
 Robert Collins – author of Exempt from Disclosure
 Paul Davids – television, science fiction writer and director
 Frank Drake – astrophysicist
 Stanton T. Friedman – ufologist
 John Greenewald, Jr. – creator of The Black Vault website
 Steven M. Greer – physician and ufologist
 David M. Jacobs – author, abduction hypnotherapists, ufologist, and professor 
 Michio Kaku – theoretical physicist and futurist
 Andrew Kissner – former New Mexico state representative
 George Knapp – paranormal journalist
 Lawrence M. Krauss – physicist
 Geoffrey A. Landis – MIT professor, scientist and science fiction writer
 Dr. Roger K. Leir – podiatric surgeon, implant investigator
 Bruce Maccabee – optical physicist and ufologist
 Herb Maursatd – sheriff
 Ted Phillips – ufologist
 Scott Ramsey – author, lead investigator for Aztec UFO crash
 Chris Rutkowski - ufologist, educator
 John F. Schuessler – founding member of MUFON
 Seth Shostak – physicist and astronomer

Episodes

Season 1 (2004)

Season 2 (2005)

Season 3 (2006)

Season 4 (2007)

DVD release
UFO Files is available on a DVD set  that is a collection of eight selected episodes. Individual episodes can also be obtained at the History Online Store.

See also
 List of topics characterized as pseudoscience
 UFO Hunters
 Hangar 1: The UFO Files
 Unidentified flying object (UFO)

References

External links
 

Television series about conspiracy theories
History (American TV channel) original programming
Paranormal television
UFO-related television
2004 American television series debuts
2007 American television series endings